The 2007 Men's Hockey Asia Cup was the seventh tournament of the Hockey Asia Cup for men. It was held from 31 August – 9 September 2007 in Chennai, India. India won, defeating Korea in the finals, seven goals to two. Korea came in second and Malaysia came third.

India led 3-1 at halftime. In the early stages of the second half, Korea staged a walkout led by their coach, because of  a decision by the umpire to disallow a goal scored by Korea. In response, India scored a goal through a counterattack in the next minute. Two Korean forwards had continued to argue with the umpire on the disallowed goal. Korea never recovered, while India's forward line scored 3 more goals to make it 7-1 before Korea reduced the margin to 7-2 in the penultimate minute. 

Baljit Singh, the Indian goalkeeper, was declared the man of the match for his excellent saves. The striking feature of India's win was that all 7 goals were 'field' goals, and none of them came through 'penalty corners' or 'strokes'. India thus ended the tournament with 57 goals for and just 5 goals against them.

Malaysia got a medal in the Hockey Asia Cup for the first time. It was also the first time since 1982 that Pakistan did not qualify for the Semi-finals in the Hockey Asia Cup. Pakistan lost to Japan 3–1 and drew their league match against  Malaysia 3–3. Pakistan lost to China in the 5th/6th place playoff, and ended 6th in the tournament.

Participants

Pools
All times are Indian Standard Time (UTC +5.30)

Pool A

Pool B

Ninth to eleventh place classification

Crossover

Ninth and tenth place

Fifth to eighth place classification

Crossover

Seventh and eighth place

Fifth and sixth place

First to fourth place classification

Semi-finals

Third and fourth place

Final

Final standings

References

External links

Hockey Asia Cup
Asia cup
Hockey Asia Cup Men
International field hockey competitions hosted by India
Hockey Asia Cup Men